German submarine U-1277 was a Type VIIC/41 U-boat of Nazi Germany's Kriegsmarine during World War II.

She was ordered on 13 June 1942, and was laid down on 6 August 1943 at Bremer Vulkan AG, Bremen, as yard number 72. She was launched on 18 March 1944 and commissioned under the command of Oberleutnant zur See Ehrenreich-Peter Stever on 3 May 1944.

Design
German Type VIIC/41 submarines were preceded by the heavier Type VIIC submarines. U-1277 had a displacement of  when at the surface and  while submerged. She had two shafts and two  propellers.

U-1277 was fitted with five  torpedo tubes (four fitted at the bow and one at the stern), fourteen torpedoes, one  SK C/35 naval gun, (220 rounds), one  Flak M42 and two  C/30 anti-aircraft guns. The boat had a complement of between forty-four and sixty.

Service history
U-1277 is unusual in so much that it either did not receive Dönitz's surrender order on 8 May 1945, or chose to ignore it. What is known is that she continued her patrol in the North Atlantic for a further month, her crew finally scuttling her on 3 June 1945 off the northern coast of Portugal. All 47 crew disembarked safely from their sinking boat in rubber dinghies and made their way ashore, landing on the beach at Angeiras, Portugal. There they were interned by the Portuguese authorities, and handed over to a British warship a few days later. The crew were not released from a POW camp until 1947.

See also
 Battle of the Atlantic

References

Bibliography

German Type VIIC/41 submarines
U-boats commissioned in 1944
U-boats scuttled in 1945
World War II submarines of Germany
1944 ships
World War II shipwrecks in the Atlantic Ocean
Ships built in Bremen (state)
Maritime incidents in June 1945